Brigitte France Byrd (née Fourneron) (born 15 February 1959) is a French-born poet and author who now lives in the United States.

Books 
 Fence Above the Sea, Ahsahta Press, 2005, 
 The Dazzling Land, California Institute of Arts and Letters, 2008, 
 Song of a Living Room, Ahsahta Press, 2009,

External links

 Brigitte Byrd's Official Web Site
 A Brigitte Byrd Reading
 Fence Above the Sea at Ahsahta Press
 The Dazzling Land at Black Zinnias Press
 Song of a Living Room at Ahsahta Press
 Brigitte Byrd's CSU Homepage
Interviews
 Oranges & Sardines
 KickingWind.com

1959 births
Living people
American women poets
French emigrants to the United States
Writers from Paris
Writers from Atlanta
Poets from Florida
Writers from Tallahassee, Florida
Florida State University alumni
French women writers
21st-century American women